The Pope of Greenwich Village is a 1984 American crime black comedy film directed by Stuart Rosenberg and starring Mickey Rourke, Eric Roberts, Daryl Hannah, Geraldine Page, Kenneth McMillan and Burt Young. Page was nominated for the Academy Award for Best Supporting Actress for her two-scene role. The film was adapted by screenwriter Vincent Patrick from his novel of the same name.

Plot
In an Italian neighborhood of Greenwich Village, cousins Charlie, a maître d'hôtel with aspirations of someday owning his own restaurant, and Paulie, a bungling schemer who works as a waiter, have expensive tastes but not much money. Paulie gets caught skimming checks, and he and Charlie are both fired. Now out of work and in debt, Charlie must find another way to pay his alimony, support his pregnant girlfriend Diane, and try to buy a restaurant.

Paulie comes to Charlie with a seemingly foolproof robbery idea involving a large amount of cash in the safe of a local business. Charlie reluctantly agrees to participate, and they manage to crack the safe with help from an accomplice, Barney, a clock repairman and locksmith. But things go sour, resulting in the accidental death of police officer Walter "Bunky" Ritter, who had been secretly taping "Bed Bug" Eddie Grant. Charlie soon learns that the money they stole belongs to Eddie.

The mob figures out that Paulie is involved, and not even his Uncle Pete, part of Eddie's crew, can help him. Eddie's henchmen cut off Paulie's left thumb as punishment.

Diane leaves Charlie and takes his money to support their unborn child, while Paulie is forced to work as a waiter for Eddie. He gives the mob Barney's name but initially refuses to identify Charlie as the third man involved. However, under pressure, he is forced to rat on his cousin. Barney leaves town and Charlie mails him his cut of the loot. When Charlie makes $20,000 on a horse, things begin to look up.

Charlie prepares for a showdown with Eddie, armed with a copy of the tape the police officer had made. But at the last moment, Paulie puts lye in Eddie's coffee; then he and Charlie casually walk away from Greenwich Village.

Cast

Production
This film was originally planned as the first on-screen pairing of actors Robert De Niro and Al Pacino, with De Niro playing Charlie and Pacino playing Paulie. Michael Cimino was initially slated to direct the film. After Rourke and Roberts signed on as the leads, Cimino wanted to finesse the screenplay with some rewriting and restructuring. However, the rewriting would have taken Cimino beyond the mandated start date for shooting, so Cimino and MGM parted ways.

The film was released under the title Village Dreams in continental Europe.

Reception

Box office
In the United States and Canada, The Pope of Greenwich Village grossed $6.8 million at the box office, against a budget of $8 million.

Critical response
 

Roger Ebert of the Chicago Sun-Times gave the film three stars, saying, "It's worth seeing for the acting, and it's got some good laughs in it, and New York is colorfully observed, but don't tell me this movie is about human nature, because it's not; it's about acting."

Leonard Maltin gave the film three stars, describing it as a "Richly textured, sharply observant film... Page stands out in great supporting cast."

Legacy
The film is a favorite of the character Vincent Chase on the television show Entourage.

References

Citations

General references 
Heard, Christopher (2006). "Chapter Six: Iconic Measures". Mickey Rourke: High and Low. London, England: Plexus Publishing Ltd. .

Further reading

External links
 
 
 

1980s black comedy films
1980s crime comedy-drama films
1980s heist films
1984 films
American black comedy films
American crime comedy-drama films
American heist films
Films based on American novels
Films directed by Stuart Rosenberg
Films scored by Dave Grusin
Films set in New York City
Metro-Goldwyn-Mayer films
United Artists films
1980s English-language films
1980s American films